Annie Byron is an AFI Award-winning Australian film, stage, and television actress best known for Wolf Creek 2, Fran, Muriel's Wedding, and Doing Time for Patsy Cline.

Early life 
Byron was born in Inverell, Australia. She attended primary school at St. Mary's Ross Hill Primary School and Sacred Heart Primary School, then high school at St. Ursula's College in Armidale and Inverell High School. She graduated with a scholarship to the University of New South Wales, where she earned an Arts degree with Honors in Drama.

After graduating university, she enrolled in the National Institute of Dramatic Art along with Steve Bisley, Debra Lawrence, Robert Menzies, Peter Kingston, Judy Davis, and Mel Gibson.

Career 
Byron was cast as Lou, the second wife of Harry Sullivan in the Australian television series The Sullivans the year after graduating from NIDA. She has since worked in numerous film, television, theatre and radio productions in Australia for over 30 years. She is best known for her roles as Lil in Wolf Creek 2, as Marge in Fran, as Rhonda's Mother in Muriel's Wedding, and as Mum in Doing Time for Patsy Cline.

She has performed with Australian theatre companies Sydney Theatre Company, Belvoir St Theatre, the Ensemble Theatre, The Q, Perth Actors Collective, Hothouse Theatre, Griffin Theatre Company, and the Playbox Theatre Company.

She performed in the sold out run of Sydney Theatre Company's production of Hedda Gabler opposite Cate Blanchett and Hugo Weaving in 2004 in Sydney and in 2006 at Brooklyn Academy of Music in New York City. She also toured internationally to Dublin, Seoul, and Montreal with Force Majeure's production of The Age.

Filmography

Film

Television

Awards 

|-
| 1985
| Fran
| AFI Award for Best Actress in a Supporting Role
| 
|-
| 1997
| Doing Time for Patsy Cline
| AFI Award for Best Performance by an Actress in a Supporting Role
| 
|-
|}

External links 
 Annie Byron on IMDb

References 

Australian film actresses
Living people
Australian stage actresses
Australian television actresses
AACTA Award winners
National Institute of Dramatic Art alumni
University of New South Wales alumni
20th-century Australian actresses
21st-century Australian actresses
Best Supporting Actress AACTA Award winners
Year of birth missing (living people)